The Caryophylliidae are a family of stony corals found from the tropics to temperate seas, and from shallow to very deep water.

Genera 

Africana Ocana & Brito, 2015
Anomocora Studer, 1878
Asterosmilia  Duncan, 1867
Aulocyathus Marenzeller, 1904
Bathycyathus Milne-Edwards & Haime, 1848
Bourneotrochus Wells, 1984
Brachytrochus † Reuss, 1864
Caryophyllia Lamarck, 1801
Ceratotrochus Milne-Edwards & Haime, 1848
Coelosimilia † 
Coenocyathus Milne-Edwards & Haime, 1848
Coenosmilia Pourtalès, 1874
Colangia Pourtalès, 1871
Concentrotheca Cairns, 1979
Confluphyllia Zibrowius & Cairns, 1997
Conotrochus Sequenza, 1864
Crispatotrochus Woods, 1878
Dasmosmilia Pourtalès, 1880
Dendrosmilia † Milne Edwards & Haime, 1848
Desmophyllum Ehrenberg, 1834
Discocyathus † Milne Edwards & Haime, 1848
Ericiocyathus Zibrowius & Cairns, 1997
 Fimbriaphyllia Veron & Pichon, 1980
Goniocorella Yabe & Eguchi, 1932
Heterocyathus Milne-Edwards & Haime, 1848
Hoplangia Gosse, 1860
Labyrinthocyathus Cairns, 1979
Leptocyathus † Milne Edwards & Haime, 1850
Lochmaeotrochus Alcock, 1902
Lophosmilia †
Monohedotrochus Kitahara & Cairns, 2005
Nomlandia Durham & Barnard, 1952
Oxysmilia Duchassaing, 1870
Paraconotrochus Cairns & Parker, 1992
Paracyathus Milne-Edwards & Haime, 1848
Parasmilia Milne Edwards & Haime, 1848
Phacelocyathus Cairns, 1979
Phyllangia Milne-Edwards & Haime, 1848
Polycyathus Duncan, 1876
Pourtalosmilia Duncan, 1884
Premocyathus Yabe & Eguchi, 1942
Rhizosmilia Cairns, 1978
Solenosmilia Duncan, 1873
Stephanocyathus Sequenza, 1864
Sympodangia Zibrowius & Cairns, 1997
Tethocyathus Kuhn, 1933
Thalamophyllia Duchassaing, 1870
Thecocyathus † Milne Edwarsd & Haime, 1848
Trochocyathus Milne-Edwards & Haime, 1848
Trochosmilia † Milne Edwards & Haime, 1848
Vaughanella Gravier, 1915

Literature 
 S. A. Fossa and A. J. Nilsen: Coral Reef Aquarium, Volume 4, Birgit Schmettkamp Verlag, Bornheim,

References

 
Scleractinia
Taxa named by James Dwight Dana
Cnidarian families